Dead Easy is a 1982 Australian action film directed by Bert Deling and starring Scott Burgess and Rosemary Paul.

Plot
In Kings Cross, Sydney, three friends end up being hunted by every thug and killer when they incur the wrath of a mob boss after they break into the entertainment business.

Cast
Scott Burgess as George
Rosemary Paul as Alex
Tim McKenzie as Armstrong
Max Phipps as Francis
Tony Barry as Ozzie
Jack O'Leary as Morry
Joe Martin as Sol
Barney Combes as Jack

References

External links

Dead Easy at Oz Movies

Australian action films
1980s English-language films
Films directed by Bert Deling
1980s Australian films